Uniconazole is a triazole chemical used as a plant growth retardant.  It is active on a wide range of plants and acts by inhibiting the production of gibberellins.

Uses
Uniconazole is applied to plants to restrain their growth.  It is often used on perennials to maintain a marketable size and/or delay flowering.  Leaves usually appear darker after application because uniconazole increases chlorophyll content.

Commercial products
The following products labeled for application to ornamental plants as plant growth retardants in the United States contain uniconazole:
 Concise
 Sumagic

Sunny is an Australian product containing uniconazole that is labeled for application to avocado trees to improve fruit size and quality.

Application methods
Uniconazole products can be sprayed onto plant foliage or applied to the soil.  After it is taken up by plant roots, uniconazole is translocated in the xylem.  The restricted-entry interval for Concise or Sumagic is 12 hours.

Reversing the effects of over-application
Over-application of any growth retardant can be devastating to a crop.  One way to reverse excessive stunting is to apply gibberellins A4 + A7 and benzyl adenine.  In the United States a product called Fresco is labeled for this use.

See also
 Paclobutrazol

References 

Agricultural chemicals
Triazoles
Chloroarenes
Lanosterol 14α-demethylase inhibitors
Plant growth regulators
Secondary alcohols